Dušan Muc (born 1952) is a Slovene painter, illustrator and costume designer. He is known for his illustrations for books for children and teenagers.

Muc was born in Ljubljana in 1952. He graduated from the Academy of Applied Arts in Belgrade in 1975 and has since worked as a costume designer, art teacher and illustrator.

He won the Levstik Award in 1991 for his illustrations in Kronika ljubezenskih pripetljajev (A Chronicle of Amorous Incidents).

Selected works

  (Dirin, Dirin, Duka ), children's songs from White Carniola, 2009
  (Wide Sea, White coast), tales from around the Mediterranean, 2009
  (When the Snowy Owl Tinkles), written by Andrej Rozman - Roza, 2008
 Koncert (The Concert), written by Tone Pavček, 2005
  (The Tale of the Golden Cockerel), written by Alexander Pushkin, 1997
 Kdo (Who), written by Neža Maurer, 1997
  (A Chronicle of Amorous Incidents), written by Tadeusz Konwicki, 1990 
  (Around Christmas Nights Dark, Hay-shed Light), proverbs from Carinthia, 2012
 , tales from Bovško, 2013
  (Simply Green), text by Evelina Umek, 2014

References

Slovenian artists
Slovenian illustrators
Living people
1952 births
Levstik Award laureates
Artists from Ljubljana
University of Belgrade alumni